The Chairman of the Legislative Assembly of Penza Oblast is the presiding officer of that legislature.

Office-holders

Sources
The Legislative Assembly of Penza Oblast

Lists of legislative speakers in Russia
Politics of Penza Oblast